Mokowe is a 1991 French adventure video game for the Amstrad CPC by JP Godey and JC Lebon of Lankhor.

Plot
The game is set in May 1975, Kenya, within the region of Mokowe. It is a time of elephant killing, ivory trading, and a secret network. It is the player's task to intervene and put a stop to it.

Reception
It received a B from Tilt, 62% from Joystick, and 82% from Amstrad.

Joystick felt the game would be an ideal present for Christmas. MicroNews wrote that despite the danger of the quest, it was well worth taking a dive into the game.

References

1991 video games
Adventure games
Amstrad CPC games
Amstrad CPC-only games
Video games developed in France
Video games set in 1975
Video games set in Kenya
Lankhor games